Eydie may refer to:

 Eydie Gormé (1928–2013), American singer.
 Steve and Eydie, an American pop vocal duet, 
 Eydie Whittington, a Democratic politician in Washington, D.C.
 The World Of Steve & Eydie, a 1972 album released by Steve Lawrence and Eydie Gorme.
 Eydie in Love, a 1958 album by Eydie Gormé.